The 2017 Trinidad and Tobago League Cup (known for sponsorship reasons as the 2017 First Citizens Cup) was the eighteenth season of the First Citizens Cup, which is the league cup competition for Trinidad and Tobago teams competing in the TT Pro League. Defence Force entered as the cup holders having defeated Ma Pau Stars by a score of 1–0 in the 2016 final. First Citizens Bank changed the slogan to "Where Winners Reign" due to the amount of money that the winner of the tournament would obtain. Teams were drawn into numbers with respect to their position in the 2017 TT Pro League at the time of the draw. It means that teams from 7–10 in the league enter at the play-offs, while from 1–6 enter at the quarterfinal stage. W Connection were crowned 8-time champions after defeating Defence Force in the final.

Draw Numbers
The teams were drawn into their respective league position at the time of the draw.
North East Stars
W Connection
Club Sando
Defence Force
San Juan Jabloteh
Morvant Caledonia United
Central
Police
Point Fortin Civic
St. Ann's Rangers

Results

Play-off round
The setup for the tournament.

Quarterfinals
The quarterfinals began with a double header at the Ato Boldon Stadium where Club Sando made a come from behind win against Morvant Caledonia United. It set the seen for an enthralling game between Defence Force and San Juan Jabloteh which ended 3-3 with 'the Army' advancing to the semis. A surprise result happened the following day with Point Fortin Civic knocking out North East Stars. The final game of the quarters was the 'Couva Classico' where 'The Savonetta Boys' beat Central to face Club Sando in the semis.

Semi-finals
Goalkeeper Andre Marchan epitomised the true heart-of-a-soldier when, limping through injury, he made three saves in a nail-biting penalty shootout against Point Fortin Civic on Friday night to put Defence Force one win away from successfully defending the First Citizens Cup. In a scintillating contest fit for a final, Defence Force surfaced 4-3 penalty winners over Civic following a dramatic 3-3 draw in semi-final one at the Ato Boldon Stadium, before Connection left it late to dispatch 10-men Club Sando 2-0 in semi-final two with a goal each from Neil Benjamin Jr. and substitute Daniel Diaz.

Third-place match

Final
Suriname international Dimitrie Apai picked up the Final’s MVP and Best Forward honours while his side W Connection celebrated a record-extending eighth First Citizens Cup by dethroning Defence Force 3-1 on Friday night at the Ato Boldon Stadium in Couva.

References 

Trinidad and Tobago League Cup